Thomas William Edward Coke, 5th Earl of Leicester MVO DL (16 May, 1910 – 3 September, 1976), was a British peer.

Early life
Major Thomas William Edward Coke, 5th Earl of Leicester of Holkham, was born on 16 May, 1910. He was the son of Thomas William Coke, 4th Earl of Leicester, and Marion Gertrude Trefusis. He was educated at Eton, and the Royal Military College, Sandhurst. He succeeded to the title of 5th Viscount Coke and 5th Earl of Leicester of Holkham on 21 August, 1949.

Courtier 
He was Equerry to the Duke of York between 1934 and 1937, and was invested as a Member, Royal Victorian Order (M.V.O.) in 1937. When the Duke of York became King George VI, the Earl became Extra Equerry to the King between 1937 and 1952, and continued as Extra Equerry to Queen Elizabeth II.

He was awarded the Order of Christ of Portugal in 1955 and later with the Royal Order of George I of Greece in 1963.

Military career 
He served as Aide-de-Camp to the Commander-in-Chief, Middle East in World War II, reaching the rank of major, and later becoming an Honorary Colonel of the Royal Norfolk Regiment. He held the office of Deputy Lieutenant (D.L.) of Norfolk from 1944.

Marriage and family 
Leicester married Lady Elizabeth Mary Yorke (born 10 March 1912, died 1985), daughter of Charles Yorke, 8th Earl of Hardwicke and Ellen Russell, on 1 October 1931.

The couple had three daughters.
 Lady Anne Veronica Coke (born 16 July, 1932) Lady Anne was one of Queen Elizabeth II's Maids of Honour at the coronation in 1953. She married the Scottish peer Colin Tennant, 3rd Baron Glenconner on 21 April 1956. They have five children. She was Extra Lady-in-Waiting to Princess Margaret, Countess of Snowdon between 1971 and 2002. After her marriage, Lady Anne Veronica Coke was styled as Baroness Glenconner on 4 October 1983. She was appointed Lieutenant, Royal Victorian Order (L.V.O.) in 1991.
 Lady Carey Elizabeth Coke (5 May, 1934 – 14 May, 2018) She married Bryan Ronald Basset on 30 April 1960. They have three sons: David Francis Basset (1961—2010), Michael James Basset (b. 1963) and James Bryan Basset (b. 1968).
 Lady Sarah Marion Coke (born 23 July, 1944) She married Major David Finlayson Wylie-Hill Walter on 27 June 1970. They have two sons: Nicholas Robert Walter (b. 1972) and James George Walter (b. 1975).

Leicester died on 3 September 1976 at age 68. Because he had no sons, on his death he was succeeded in the earldom and other titles by his cousin Anthony Coke, 6th Earl of Leicester. Coke was the great-uncle of the actress Miranda Raison.

References

1908 births
1976 deaths
British Army personnel of World War II
Royal Norfolk Regiment officers
Thomas Coke
Deputy Lieutenants of Norfolk
5th Earl of Leicester
Equerries
Graduates of the Royal Military College, Sandhurst
Members of the Royal Victorian Order
People educated at Eton College
Recipients of the Order of George I
People from Holkham